Senegal’s high population growth and migration from the rural areas to Dakar has resulted in the mushrooming of squatter settlements on Dakar’s periphery.

Housing affordability 
Further, the high costs of construction materials – imported for the most part – combined with prohibitive interest rates – in the range of 8-10% according to BHS, the housing bank – have made housing too expensive for the average Senegalese and for low-income families. As a result, there is a critical shortage of affordable housing, and the Government has estimated at 120,000 the number of units to be built every year in order to meet a growing demand.

Under President Abdoulaye Wade’s initiative “one family-one home”, a battery of incentives has been presented to potential homebuilders, as long as the cost of the house does not exceed CFA Franc 7 million ($15,500). They range from providing free land to homebuilders, a 3.3% subsidy to the target buyers of the houses, and tax holidays for imported construction equipment.

References

 
Economy of Senegal
Society of Senegal
Senegal